Aap Ki Parchhaiyan (English: Your Shadows) is a 1964 Bollywood film. Produced and directed by Mohan Kumar, the film stars Dharmendra, Shashikala, Supriya Choudhury, Om Prakash and Manorama. The film's music is by Madan Mohan. A couple of songs; "Main nigahen tere chehre se hataaoon kaise", by Mohd. Rafi and "Agar mujhse mohabbat hai" by Lata Mangeshkar are plus points of this family drama.

Cast
 Dharmendra as  Chandramohan Chopra 'Channi'
 Supriya Choudhury as Asha
 Vijayalaxmi as usha( Rekhas friend)
 Shashikala        as	Rekha
 Suresh            as	Baldev Chopra
 Nazir Hussain as Dinanath Chopra
 Leela Chitnis     as  Mrs. Dinanath Chopra
 Mumtaz Begum  a Rekha's Mother
 Om Prakash as  Vilayti Ram
 Moppet Rajoo		
 Manorama as  Mrs. Vilayti Ram
 Brahm Bhardwaj as Rekha's 
Father
 Kartar Singh (Sikh passenger in train)
 Khairati as Gulzari (Om Prakash assistant)
 Madhu Apte		
 Santosh Kapoor		
 Sadhu Singh		
 Moolchand  as   Lala Khushiram
 Nazir Kashmiri		
 Sayyed
 Harbans Darshan M. Arora   as  Chaman Lal

Music
The music of the film was composed by Madan Mohan, and Lyrics provided by Raja Mehdi Ali Khan.

External links 
 

1964 films
1960s Hindi-language films
Films scored by Madan Mohan
Films directed by Mohan Kumar